The 2014–15 season is the Panathinaikos' 56th consecutive season in Super League Greece.

They are also competing in the Greek Cup, UEFA Champions League and in the UEFA Europa League.

Players

Transfers

In

Total spending: €0

Out

Total income:  €2,200,000

Expenditure:   €2,200,000

Pre-season and friendlies

Competitions

Super League Greece

Regular season

League table

Matches

The sixth game, against Panetolikos F.C, which was originally scheduled for October 5, will be held on 4 December.
The eleventh game, against Ergotelis F.C, which was originally scheduled for November 23, will be held on 11 January 2015.
The sixteenth game, against PAS Giannina, started on 4 January 2015 but it stopped due fog. The game continued on 5 January 2015 (time 15:00).

UEFA play-offs

League table

Matches

Greek Cup

Group H

Third round

UEFA Champions League

Qualifying phase

Third qualifying round

UEFA Europa League

Play-off round

Group E

Season statistics (only official games have included)

Top goalscorers

References

External links
 Panathinaikos FC official website

Panathinaikos
Panathinaikos F.C. seasons